HD 202951 is a probable binary star system located in the northern constellation of Equuleus. It is near the lower limit of visibility to the naked eye, having an apparent visual magnitude of 5.97. It is moving closer with a heliocentric radial velocity of −37 km/s.

This value provides a lower bound for the actual semimajor axis.

The visible component is an evolved K-type giant star with a stellar classification of K5 III. It is a candidate variable star of unknown type, showing an amplitude variation of 0.0115 magnitude with a frequency of 0.47645 times per day, or one cycle per 2.1 days. X-ray emission has been detected from this system.

References

K-type giants
Durchmusterung objects
Equuleus
202951
0105224
8149
Spectroscopic binaries